Okolo Slovenska is an annual road cycling stage race in Slovakia. Founded in 1954, since 2017 it has been rated as a 2.1 event on the UCI Europe Tour. It is a stage race that usually includes five or more stages.

History 
Okolo Slovenska started on 19 June 1954, at Stalin square in Bratislava, and included seven stages. The first race was won by Czech cyclist Karel Nesl. The Slovak cyclist Vlastimil Ružička won three of the seven stages of the race.

Winners

Classifications 
As of the 2022 edition, the jerseys worn by the leaders of the individual classifications are:
  Yellow Jersey – Worn by the leader of the general classification.
  Green Jersey – Worn by the leader of the points classification.
  Red Jersey – Worn by the leader of the climbing classification.
  White Jersey – Worn by the best rider under 23 years of age on the overall classification.
  Red number Jersey – Worn by the leader of the combativity classification.
  "Slovak" Jersey – Worn by the best Slovak rider of the overall classification.

See also 
 Sport in Slovakia
 Slovak Cycling Federation

References

External links 
 
Tour de Slovaquie results from Cycling Archives
Tour de Slovaquie results from Cycling News

 
UCI Europe Tour races
Recurring sporting events established in 1954
Cycle races in Slovakia
1954 establishments in Czechoslovakia
Annual sporting events in Slovakia
Summer events in Slovakia